Neveux is a French surname. Notable people with the surname include:

 Brigitte Neveux, French politician and member of the far-right National Front
 Georges Neveux (1900–1982), French dramatist and poet

French-language surnames